C. Nicole Mason (born 1976, Los Angeles, California) is an American author, columnist and researcher. She is president and chief executive officer emeritus of the Institute for Women's Policy Research and  lecturer in the Women's Studies department at Georgetown University. Mason was named as one of the 'World's 50 Greatest Leaders' by Fortune magazine.
Her research work serves to influence policy outcomes and public attitudes by focusing on the impact of the intersections of race, class, and gender. Her writing and commentary have been featured in major newspapers and outlets including New York Times, MSNBC, CNN, NBC, CBS, The Washington Post, Marie Claire and USA Today, among many others. At the start of the COVID-19 pandemic, she coined the term ‘Shecession’ to describe the unbalanced impact of the employment and income losses on women.

In 2016, she authored the Born Bright: A Young Girl’s Journey from Nothing to Something in America, a book about her childhood in California to her acceptance at Howard University.

Bibliography

References

1976 births
American writers
Howard University alumni
Living people
Women academics